Nowa Huta (literally "The New Steel Mill") is the easternmost district of Kraków, Poland. With more than 200,000 inhabitants, it is one of the most populous areas of the city. Until 1990, the neighbouring districts were considered expansions of the original Nowa Huta district, and were linked by the same tramway system. They are now separate districts of Kraków.

Nowa Huta is one of the largest planned socialist realist settlements or districts ever built (another being Magnitogorsk in Russia) and "one of the most renowned examples of deliberate social engineering" in the entire world. Built as a utopian ideal city, its street hierarchy, layout and certain grandeur of buildings often resemble Paris or London. The high abundance of parks and green areas in Nowa Huta make it the greenest corner of Kraków.

History 
The historic area of present-day Nowa Huta is one of the few places in Poland settled continuously since the neolithic age. Archaeological research has discovered a large Celtic and West Slavic settlement. In the 8th century, a mound was erected nearby by the Vistulans tribe. According to legend, the Wanda Mound is a tomb of Wanda, daughter of Krakus, a mythical founder of Kraków. In the 13th century, a Cistercian monastery in the village of Mogiła was built.

In the nineteenth century and at the beginning of the twentieth century, during the partitions of Poland and up to World War I, the outskirts of Nowa Huta constituted a border between territories controlled by Austria-Hungary and Russia. One can find historic Austro-Hungarian fortresses there, as well as one of Europe's oldest permanent airfields (Kraków-Rakowice-Czyżyny Airport, currently housing the Polish Aviation Museum).

Following the Vistula–Oder Offensive in 1945, the Socialist government had encountered substantial resistance to their new regime from middle-class residents of Kraków. A referendum held by the authorities was soundly defeated by the people of Kraków – a major cause of embarrassment to the government. To "correct the class imbalance", the authorities commenced building a satellite industrial city to attract people from lower socioeconomic backgrounds to the region, such as peasants and the working-class.

Nowa Huta was created in 1949 as a separate city near Kraków, on terrain repossessed by the Socialist government from the former villages of Mogiła, Pleszów and Krzesławice. It was planned as a colossal center of heavy industry. The city was intended to become an ideal city for Socialist propaganda, and populated primarily by industrial workers. In 1951, it became a part of the city of Kraków as its new district, and in the following year, construction of tramway connections was underway.

On July 22, 1954, the Vladimir Lenin Steelworks was opened, and in less than twenty years, the factory became the largest steel mill in Poland. In the 1960s, the city expanded rapidly. The monumental architecture of the Plac Centralny (Central Square) was surrounded by colossal apartment blocks. In the 1970s, steel production reached seven million tons annually. At the same time, the largest tobacco factory in Poland was opened there, as well as a colossal cement factory.

The reasons for building such an industrial city near Kraków were primarily ideological, because coal needed to be transported from Silesia, and iron ore needed to be transported from the Soviet Union, while the products were shipped to other parts of Poland, due to local demand for steel being relatively small. Such disadvantages became visible in the 1980s, when the economic crisis halted the city's growth. Nevertheless, the primacy of political reasons for choosing this location is not obvious. Kraków was a center of learning, with established schools of engineering and scientific research departments, providing the necessary expertise along with qualified staff. The presence of good railway links for bringing raw materials and the proximity of the river to supply water also played a role. The site was elevated high enough to avoid flooding, and the historic villages that it replaced were relatively small. All of the above factors quickly made the investment pay off.

In line with the then policy of state atheism, one significant type of building lacking from the original urban design of Nowa Huta was a Roman Catholic church. However, the public campaign to construct such a building lasted several years. As early as 1960, inhabitants of Nowa Huta began applying for consent to build a church. During the same year, violent street demonstrations with riot police erupted over a wooden cross that was erected without a permit. The locals were supported by then Bishop Karol Wojtyla, the future Pope John Paul II, who began hosting outdoor Christmas Eve Midnight Masses in 1959, regardless of weather, and replaced the cross every time that it was removed. In 1967, permits to build the desired church were granted, and the Arka Pana (Lord's Ark) Church was under construction from 1969 to 1977. The complex was consecrated by Wojtyla in May 1977. Wojtyla himself, after his ascension to the papacy in 1978, intended to visit Nowa Huta during his first papal pilgrimage in 1979, but was not permitted to do so.

During the 1980s, Nowa Huta became a city of many demonstrations and violent street protests of the Solidarity movement, fought by the police. At that time, almost 29,000 of the 38,000 workers of the Lenin Steelworks belonged to the Solidarity trade union.

Architecture

Before 1956 (socialist realism) 

The design movement of socialist realism in Poland, as in other member-states of the Warsaw Pact, was enforced from 1949 to 1956. It involved all domains of art, but its most spectacular accomplishments were made in the field of architecture. The main lines of this new trend were very precisely indicated in a 1949 resolution of the National Council of Party Architects. Architecture was an extremely important weapon to the creators of a new social order. It was intended to help to form a socialist theme – the ideas sparking citizens' consciousness and outlook on life. During this great work, a crucial role fell to the architect, who wasn't perceived as merely an engineer creating streets and edifices, but as an "engineer of the human soul". The general outlook of a building was more valued than its simple aesthetics. It needed to express social ideas, to arouse a feeling of persistence and power.

Since the style of the Renaissance was generally regarded as the most revered in old Polish architecture, it was also intended to become Poland's socialist national format. However, in the course of incorporating the principles of socialist realism, there were a number of deviations observed. One of these was to more closely reflect Soviet architecture, which resulted in the majority of works blending into one another; and finally, the general acceptance of the classicist form. From 1953, critical opinions were increasingly frequently heard, and the doctrine was finally given up in 1956. To this day, the socrealist city center is considered a monument of architecture.

After 1956 

Following the political liberalization of the Polish October in 1956, it became possible to introduce modernist style in architecture. Polish architects were allowed to visit Stockholm to learn about the newest solutions in urban design. As a result, the so-named "Swedish" apartment block was developed according to Le Corbusier guidelines. Among other buildings from that era, the Światowid cinema is worth noting. In the 1980s, the first postmodernist buildings were built, a notable example being the Centrum E housing estate. In the 1970s and 1980s, many apartment blocks were built using plattenbau.

Nowa Huta's central "Avenue of Roses" featured a nationally known statue of Vladimir Lenin, unveiled on April 28, 1973. The bronze monument was pulled down in 1989 by the city, as a result of numerous protests by local citizens. Several thousand onlookers came to watch the dismantling.<ref>UPHEAVAL IN THE EAST; Lenin Statue in Mothballs, The New York Times, December 11, 1989. Retrieved June 9, 2013.</ref>

Sacral architecture should also be noted, particularly the Arka Pana (Lord's Ark) Church, which was built to resemble Noah's Ark. It was designed by the architects Wojciech Pietrzyk and Jan Grabacki, with the design being influenced by Le Corbusier's Notre Dame du Haut in Ronchamp.

 Nowa Huta today 

Since the fall of socialism, the city that was once a showpiece for Stalinism now boasts many tributes to ardent opponents of the ideology. Streets formerly named after Vladimir Lenin and the Cuban Revolution have been renamed to honor Pope John Paul II and the Polish World War II hero Władysław Anders. Other streets were renamed after Edward Rydz-Śmigły and Ignacy Mościcki, politicians of the pre-World War II Sanation government. In 2004, Plac Centralny, Nowa Huta's central square, which once was home to a giant statue of Lenin – on display at the High Chaparral Museum in Hillerstorp, Sweden, was renamed Plac Centralny im. Ronalda Reagana (Ronald Reagan Central Square) in honor of the former US President. However, this decision led to many objections, and the traditional name is still widely used.  In 2014, a bright green statue of a urinating Lenin was installed as part of an arts festival.

 Cultural significance 
 Nowa Huta is the location of an award-winning film by Andrzej Wajda, titled Man of Marble, based on the true story of the rise and fall of a Stakhanovite bricklayer who helped build the new model socialist city during the course of Stalinism in Poland. Man of Marble, made in the mid-1970s, presaged the Solidarity labour union movement in Gdańsk that was ultimately responsible for overthrowing the Stalinist regime in Poland, as the film begins in Nowa Huta and ends in Gdańsk. The term "Man of Marble" presented in this film also contrasts the name of Joseph Stalin himself, whose last name means "Man of Steel".

 When the district was built in the 1950s, songs promoted by propaganda in the People's Republic of Poland included the widely popular hit single: "O Nowej to Hucie piosenka" ("This Song is about Nowa Huta"), still widely remembered to this day, especially by many older Poles.
 Nowa Huta has figured prominently in Polish literature since its very beginning. The earliest works focused on ideological progress and on the conflict between the "bourgeois city" (Kraków) and its new Socialist district of Nowa Huta (a "Party bastion"). Among writers on this topic were Marian Brandys (Początek opowieści, 1951) and Tadeusz Konwicki (Przy budowie, 1950). A hefty supply of short poems included Jalu Kurek's "Z nowej Huty pocztówka" (1953; a city park (pl) was named after him for this particular work), and future Nobel laureate Wisława Szymborska ("Na powitanie budowy socjalistycznego miasta", 1952, from the collection of Stalinist paeans of praise known as "Dlatego żyjemy"). Although Nowa Huta disappeared from literary narratives after the period of Socialist realism, it returned during the 1980s when it became the hotbed of struggle against Socialism, and later, during the 1990s, when it became a symbol of the new post-Socialist reality stemming from both its socialist and anti-socialist past.
 Poland's first ever opera, written in 1794 by Wojciech Bogusławski, known as "The Presumed Miracle, or the Krakovians and the Highlanders", is set in the historic village of Mogiła, which Nowa Huta was built over. The two newest housing estates are named after the play: osiedle Krakowiaków ("Krakóvians Estate") and osiedle Górali ("Highlanders Estate"). The opera by Bogusławski was also the first theater production played at the opening of the district's legendary Teatr Ludowy ("People's Theater").
 "Oedipus – a tragedy from Nowa Huta", is a play based on the ancient Greek myth of Oedipus, premiered in Łaźnia Nowa Theater, under direction of Bartosz Szydłowski

 Cultural venues 
 Teatr Ludowy (People's Theater), Nowa Huta's original theater venue.
   art-house cinema
  
 Cyprian Norwid Cultural Center

 Landmarks 

 Wanda Mound
 Mogiła Abbey (Cistercian abbey) (1225)
 Jan Matejko Manor, Krzesławice
 Branice Manor
 Church of Saint Wenceslaus (1226)
 Church of Saint Bartholomew (1466)
 Austro-Hungarian fortresses: Batowice, Mistrzejowice, Dłubnia, Krzesławice, Grębałów, Mogiła
 Tadeusz Sendzimir Steelworks (formerly Huta Lenina im. Kraków (Vladimir Lenin Steelworks))
 Plac Centralny, and Aleja Róż (Avenue of Roses) architecture
 Arka Pana (Lord's Ark) Church and Chapel of Conciliation, Bieńczyce
 Polish Aviation Museum, Czyżyny
 Branch of the Historical Museum of Kraków, History of Nowa Huta

 Notable people 
 Marcin Cabaj
 Jerzy Fedorowicz
 Michał Pazdan
 Ireneusz Raś
 Paulina Dudek (Dudziszon)
 Józef Szajna
 Marcin Wasilewski

 Industry 
 Tadeusz Sendzimir Steelworks, owned by Mittal Steel Company
 Kraków Power Station
 Philip Morris Cigarette Company
 Comarch, an international software house
 INTERIA.PL, a company operating Poland's third-largest portal

 Education 
 Faculty of Mechanical Engineering, Tadeusz Kościuszko University of Technology
 Academy of Physical Education (AWF)

 Sport 
Nowa Huta is home to several of Kraków's notable sports clubs. Rich in history, Hutnik Nowa Huta football club has sizeable support in the city, as does Kraków's only speedway club, Wanda Kraków.

 See also 
 Głos – Tygodnik Nowohucki
 Kraków
 History of Kraków
 Eisenhüttenstadt
 Magnitogorsk

 Notes and references 

 Bibliography 
 Mariusz Czepczyński, Cultural Landscapes of Post-Socialist Cities. Representation of Powers and Needs. Ashgate 2008. .
 Katherine Lebow, Unfinished Utopia. Nowa Huta, Stalinism and Polish Society 1949–1956. Cornell University Press 2013. 
 Stanisław Panek and Edmund Piasecki. Nowa Huta''. Wrocław 1971.

 

Districts of Kraków
Planned cities in Poland
Socialist planned cities
Architecture related to utopias